Gymnopilus naucorioides is a species of mushroom-forming fungus in the family Hymenogastraceae.

Description

Habitat and distribution
Gymnopilus naucorioides grows on hemlock. It has been collected in Tennessee, in August.

See also

List of Gymnopilus species

References

naucorioides
Fungi of North America
Fungi described in 1969
Taxa named by Lexemuel Ray Hesler